Rosato may refer to:
 Rosato (surname), a surname of Italian origin
 Rosato (wine), a style of Italian rosé wine